Wilmot is a civil parish in Carleton County, New Brunswick, Canada, located along the international border northwest of Woodstock. It comprises one local service district, part of one village, and part of another LSD, all of which are members of the Western Valley Regional Service Commission (WVRSC).

The Census subdivision of Wilmot Parish includes all of the civil parish except the village.

Origin of name
The parish was named in honour of Lemuel Allan Wilmot, Lieutenant Governor of New Brunswick at the time of its erection.

History
Wilmot was erected in 1869 from the western polling district of Simonds Parish and originally included part of Wicklow Parish.

Boundaries
Wilmot Parish is bounded:

 on the west by the international border;
 on the north by the prolongation of a land grant at the mouth of Whitemarsh Brook to the international border;
 on the east by two reserved lines running east of the Charleston Road and west of or along the Mount Delight and Wilmot Roads;
 and on the south by the prolongation of the southern line of a land grant at the mouth of the Little Presque Isle Stream to the international border.

Evolution of boundaries
Wilmot originally a strip of southern Wicklow Parish more than a kilometre wide. This included the northern part of Centreville.

In 1870 the northern boundary was moved south to its present position.

Municipality
The village of Centreville extends along the Big Presque Isle Stream from the northern parish line to the former railway.

Local service districts
Both local service districts assess for the basic LSD services of fire protection, police services, land use planning, emergency measures, and dog control.

Wilmot Parish
The local service district of the parish of Wilmot originally comprised all of the parish outside Centreville.

The parish LSD was established in 1966 to assess for fire protection. Community services were added in 1967.

Today the LSD assesses for only basic services. The taxing authority is 217.00 Wilmot.

LSD advisory committee: Unknown.

Lakeville
Lakeville comprises an area on the eastern and northern shores of Williamstown Lake, extending north and south along Route 560, west along Brookville Road, and north along Good Corner Road; it also includes a single land grant in Wakefield Parish along the western side of Route 560. The communities of Brookville and Lakeville are both part of the LSD.

Lakeville was established in 1985 to add street lighting, recreational facilities, and first aid and ambulance services.

Today the LSD assesses for street lighting and community & recreation services. The taxing authority is 230.00 Lakeville.

LSDAC: Yes. Chair Joseph Weston sat on the WVRSC board of directors from at least 2015 until June 2018, first as an alternate and then as a full member from August 2016. Chair Carl Rattray replaced Weston on the WVRSC board and has served since July 2018.

Communities
Communities at least partly within the parish; bold indicates an incorporated municipality

  Avondale
 Avondale Road
 Beckim Settlement
  Bloomfield
 Bradley Corner
 Brookville
 Carvell
  Centreville
 Charleston
 Deerville
 Digby Corner
 Good Corner
 Hunters Corner
  Lakeville
 Long Settlement
 Lower Bloomfield
 McKeaghan
 Weston
  Williamstown
 Wilmot

Bodies of water
Bodies of water at least partly in the parish:

  North Branch Meduxnekeag River
 Dead Stream
 Little Presque Isle Stream
 Gowan Lake
 Ketch Lake
 Marvin Lake
 McWaid Lake
 Waters Lake
 Williamstown Lake

Other notable places
Parks, historic sites, and other noteworthy places at least partly in the parish.
 Clarke Brook Protected Natural Area
 Lakeville Protected Natural Area
 Two Mile Brook Fen Protected Natural Area
 Williamstown Lake Protected Natural Area

Demographics
Parish population total does not include portion within  Centreville

Population
Population trend

Language
Mother tongue (2016)

See also
List of parishes in New Brunswick

Notes

References

Local service districts of Carleton County, New Brunswick
Parishes of Carleton County, New Brunswick